Empire Cameron was a  cargo ship which was built in 1941 for the Ministry of War Transport (MoWT). She was sold in 1946 and renamed St Margaret. In 1960, she was sold and renamed Agna, serving until scrapped in 1963.

Description
The ship was built by William Denny & Bros Ltd, Dumbarton, as yard number 1358. She was launched on 19 November 1941 and completed in December.

Her GRT was 7,015 and she had a NRT of 5,175. Her DWT was 9,207. The engine was built by J G Kincaid Ltd, Greenock.

History
Empire Cameron was built for the MoWT. She was placed under the management of F C Strick & Co Ltd. The Code Letters BCRW were allocated. Her Official Number was 168704.

On 10 August 1942, Spitfire Vb EP192 was loaded onto Empire Cameron as part of her cargo. It was delivered to Takoradi, Gold Coast on 15 September.

Convoys
Empire Cameron was a member of a number of convoys during the Second World War.

ONS 100
Convoy ONS 100 was a North Atlantic convoy that departed Liverpool on 2 June 1942 bound for Cape Cod.

MKS 4
Convoy MKS 4 departed Algiers, Algeria on 24 December 1942 bound for Liverpool.

MKS 8
Convoy MKS 8 departed Gibraltar on 22 February 1943 bound for Liverpool. Empire Cameron was on a voyage from Algiers and joined the convoy at Gibraltar.

MKS 13G
Convoy MKS 13G departed Gibraltar on 22 May 1943 bound for Liverpool. Empire Cameron was carrying a cargo of molybdenum.

MKS 46
Convoy MKS 46 departed Oran on 20 April 1944 bound for Liverpool. Empire Cameron was on a voyage from Alexandria, Egypt, joining the convoy at Oran and leaving at her destination of Augusta, Italy.

MKS 48 / MKS 48G
Convoy MKS 48 departed Oran on 8 May 1944 bound for Liverpool. Empire Cameron was a member of this convoy. On 10 May 1944, the convoy sailed from Gibraltar under the designation of MKS 48G.

During 1943, management was transferred to Shakespear Shipping Co Ltd. In 1946, Empire Cameron was sold to Shakespear Shipping and renamed St Margaret. She was placed under the management of South American Saint Line. In 1960, St Margaret was sold to Agna Compagnia Navigazione SA, Panama. She was renamed Agna, serving until 1963. She arrived at Yawata, Japan on 17 July 1963 for scrapping.

References

1941 ships
Ships built on the River Clyde
Steamships of the United Kingdom
Ministry of War Transport ships
Empire ships
Merchant ships of the United Kingdom
Merchant ships of Panama
Steamships of Panama